Cecil College is a public college in Bay View, Maryland in Cecil County.

History
Cecil College was founded in 1968 to meet the educational needs of Cecil County residents. On June 13, 2007, the Maryland Higher Education Commission voted to accept its petition to change its name to Cecil College.

Organization
Cecil College is governed by a board of trustees appointed by the governor of the state of Maryland. The president reports directly to the board of trustees.

Academics
Cecil College is a member of the Maryland Association of Community Colleges, accredited by the Middle States Commission on Higher Education, and authorized by the Maryland Higher Education Commission to grant the associate degree. Nursing programs at Cecil College are accredited by the Maryland State Board of Nursing and the National League for Nursing Accrediting Commission. The college also conducts transportation and logistics programs.

Notable alumni
 Kevin Palmer - basketball player

References

External links

 Official website

Two-year colleges in the United States
Community and junior colleges in Maryland
Universities and colleges in Cecil County, Maryland
Educational institutions established in 1968
1968 establishments in Maryland
NJCAA athletics